The Shakespeare Prize was an annual prize for writing or performance awarded to a British citizen by the Hamburg Alfred Toepfer Foundation.  First given by Alfred Toepfer in 1937 as an expression of his Anglophilia in the face of tense international conditions, the prize was awarded only twice before the outbreak of World War II, to composer Ralph Vaughan Williams and poet John Masefield.  The award resumed in 1967 following the visit of Queen Elizabeth to Germany and the last prize was awarded in 2006.

Recipients

1937 Ralph Vaughan Williams
1938 John Masefield
1967 Sir Peter Hall
1968 Graham Greene
1969 Roy Pascal
1970 Harold Pinter
1971 Janet Baker
1972 Paul Scofield
1973 Peter Brook
1974 Graham Sutherland
1975 John Pritchard
1976 Philip Larkin
1977 Margot Fonteyn
1978 John Dexter
1979 Tom Stoppard
1980 Roy Strong
1981 John Schlesinger
1982 Doris Lessing
1983 David Hockney
1984 Colin Davis
1985 Alec Guinness
1986 Harold Jenkins
1987 Gwyneth Jones
1988 Iris Murdoch
1989 Peter Shaffer
1990 Neville Marriner
1991 Maggie Smith
1992 Richard Attenborough
1993 Julian Barnes
1994 Robert Burchfield
1995 George Christie
1996 Simon Rattle
1997 Howard Hodgkin
1998 Derek Jacobi
1999 Ian McEwan
2000 Sam Mendes
2001 Tony Cragg
2002 A. S. Byatt
2003 Matthew Bourne
2004 Paul Muldoon
2005 Richard Dawkins
2006 Bryn Terfel

References

External links
 Alfred Toepfer Foundation: Prizes and Medals until 2006

British literary awards
Awards established in 1937
1937 establishments in the United Kingdom
Awards disestablished in 2006
2006 disestablishments in the United Kingdom
Dramatist and playwright awards
German awards
Germany–United Kingdom relations